Bohr most often refers to:
 Niels Bohr (1885–1962), Danish atomic physicist, Nobel Prize in physics 1922

Bohr may also refer to:

Other People with the Surname, Bohr

 Aage Bohr (1922–2009), Danish nuclear physicist, Nobel Prize in physics 1975, son of Niels Bohr
 Christian Bohr (1855–1911), Danish physician and physiologist, father of Harald and of Niels Bohr
 Harald Bohr (1887–1951), Danish Olympic silver medalist football player and mathematician; brother of Niels Bohr
 Margrethe Bohr (1890–1984), wife, editor, and transcriber for Danish physicist Niels Bohr

Astronomy
 3948 Bohr, asteroid named after Niels Bohr
 Bohr (crater), a lunar crater
 Vallis Bohr, a lunar valley

Places
 Niels Bohr Institute, University of Copenhagen, Denmark
In Iran:
 Bohr, Bushehr, a village in Bushehr Province
 Bohr-e Bagh, a village in Bushehr Province
 Bohr-e Hajj Nowshad, a village in Bushehr Province

Science
 Bohr effect, property of hemoglobin discovered by Christian Bohr
 Bohr magneton, unit of magnetic moment proposed by Niels Bohr
 Bohr model, atomic theory due to Niels Bohr
 Bohr radius, radius of atomic orbit in Bohr model
 Bohrium, chemical element number 107 named after Niels Bohr

Other uses
 Bohr bug, a type of software bug
 Bohr compactification, mathematical concept due to Harald Bohr

Disambiguation pages with surname-holder lists